Maple Ridge is a residential neighbourhood in the southeast quadrant of Calgary, Alberta. The community is bounded to the east by Deerfoot Trail, north by Southland Drive, west by Willow Park and south by Anderson Road. The Maple Ridge golf course, developed in the Bow River valley, lines the community to the south and east.

It is represented in the Calgary City Council by the Ward 14 councillor and, along with Willow Park, makes up the combined community of WillowRidge.

Maple Ridge is home to the popular Maple Ridge Golf Course, located at 1240 Mapleglade Drive.

Demographics
In the City of Calgary's 2014 municipal census, Maple Ridge had a population of  living in  dwellings.

Residents in this community had a median household income of $88,417 in 2010. 

All buildings are single family detached homes, and in 2000 6.1% of the housing was used for renting.

Schools in the neighborhood:

Maple Ridge Elementary (K-4)

St. William Elementary (K-6)

R.T. Alderman Junior High (5-9)

Willow Park Arts-Centered Learning (Middle School) (5-9)

Notre-Dame-de-la-Paix (French)

See also
List of neighbourhoods in Calgary
R. T. Alderman Junior High
Willow Park School

References

External links
WillowRidge Community Association

Neighbourhoods in Calgary